Crassuncus ecstaticus is a moth of the family Pterophoridae. It is known from Uganda, Kenya and Malawi.

References

Oidaematophorini
Moths of Africa
Moths described in 1932